Mac Fleet (born October 17, 1990, in San Diego, California) is a male mid-distance runner from the United States. Fleet won two 1500 m NCAA titles in the 2013 NCAA Division I Outdoor Track and Field Championships and 2014 NCAA Division I Outdoor Track and Field Championships.  Mac Fleet won in 1500 meters at 2009 Pan American Junior Athletics Championships.

Competition Record
At 2015 Morton Games, Fleet placed 7th in mile in 3:58.48. In 2016, Fleet placed 8th in the Hoka One One USATF Middle Distance Classic 1500 m in 3:40.20 and 9th in the Prefontaine Classic mile in 4:06.10. In 2017, Fleet placed 6th in Dana Point 10 km road race in 30:19, 14th in Carlsbad 5000 road race in 14:38, 9th in the Portland Track Festival 1500 m in 3:39.49. In 2018, Fleet placed 8th in the Millrose Games Mile in 4:03.14, and 8th in the Sydney Athletics Grand Prix 1500 m in 3:45.08.

NCAA
Mac Fleet is a 3 time Pac-12 team champion. As a freshman, Fleet was part of a team at University of Oregon won a 2010 Penn Relays wheel in the DMR in 9:30.69. At the 2012 NCAA Division I Cross Country Championships, Fleet helped Oregon Ducks to place 20th as a team. At the 2013 NCAA Division I Cross Country Championships, Fleet helped Oregon Ducks to place 5th as a team. Fleet won two 1500 m NCAA titles in the 2013 NCAA Division I Outdoor Track and Field Championships and 2014 NCAA Division I Outdoor Track and Field Championships. After a senior year in July 2014 Heusden-Zolder KBC Night of Athletics Belgium, ran 1500 m in 3:38.62.

University City High school (San Diego)
Mac Fleet won 2008 California state Cross country Division 3 title for University City High School (San Diego). Fleet won 2009 CIF California State Meet 1600 m in 4:05.33.

Mac Fleet graduated from University City High School (San Diego) as a 2-time California Interscholastic Federation state champion.  His father, Dale Fleet, was also a CIF State Champion, winning the 1971 CIF California State Meet in the 2 mile run running for Clairemont High School.

References

External links 

 
 
 

American male long-distance runners
American male middle-distance runners
Living people
1990 births
Sportspeople from California
Track and field athletes from California
Oregon Ducks men's cross country runners
Oregon Ducks men's track and field athletes
University of Oregon alumni